Bruce Steel (born October 17, 1966) is an American former professional tennis player.

Steel, the son of a San Diego urologist, attended Dartmouth College in the 1980s. He played collegiate tennis for the Dartmouth Big Green and earned All-Ivy doubles selection in 1988.

On the professional tour, Steel competed mostly in satellite tournaments and reached a best singles world ranking of 387. In 1991 he made the final round of the Wimbledon qualifiers for singles and partnered with Jeff Tarango in the doubles main draw at Queen's Club. He also featured in the qualifying draw at that year's US Open and was a doubles finalist in the 1991 Hall of Fame Championships held in Newport, Rhode Island.

ATP Tour finals

Doubles (1)

References

External links
 
 

1966 births
Living people
American male tennis players
Dartmouth Big Green athletes
College men's tennis players in the United States
Tennis players from San Diego